Bang is a bilingual crime drama English/Welsh television series, created by Roger Williams, that was first broadcast on S4C on 10 September 2017. The show, set in Port Talbot, Wales, stars Jacob Ifan as Sam Jenkins, a loner who becomes entangled in a web of lies after coming into possession of a gun, and Catrin Stewart as his sister Gina, who is a police detective. The second series was broadcast on S4C in February–March 2020.

Initial broadcasts carried entirely English subtitles (although these need to be accessed by the viewer, and do not appear on screen), while repeat airings carried encoded English subtitles for scenes spoken in Welsh. The series was concurrently available on the BBC iPlayer as part of the BBC's ongoing relationship with S4C.

Production
Series creator Roger Williams said of the bilingual nature of the script; "It was very much about story; a strong story that would get people tuning in every week to see what would happen. Then the conversation about language started to happen. Port Talbot isn't the strongest place for the Welsh language. There are quite a small percentage of speakers compared with Carmarthenshire, Ceredigion, Gwynedd. From that stumbling block I started to think: ‘Why don’t we reflect the linguistic diversity of a place like Port Talbot?’ For all of us who are bilingual, the reality is that we live our lives through two languages."

Cast
 Jacob Ifan as Sam Jenkins, a loner who works for a local distribution firm
 Catrin Stewart as PC Gina Jenkins, Sam's sister
 Nia Roberts as Linda Murray, Sam and Gina's mother
 Jack Parry Jones as PC Luke Lloyd, Gina's long-term work partner 
 Suzanne Packer as Chief Inspector Layla Davies, head of police
 Rebecca Hayes as Mel
 Rhydian Jones as Russell
 Gareth Jewell as DI Carl Roberts (series 1)
 Sara Lloyd as Patricia Rose, wife of murder victim Stevie Rose (series 1)
 Chris Reilly as Ray Murray, Sam's stepfather who owns a local builder's yard (series 1)
 Kate Jarman as Marie (series 1)
 Matthew Aubrey as Rhys (series 1)
 Lily Enticknap as Ruby (series 1)
 Gwyneth Keyworth as Ela (series 1)
 Jake Burgum as Neil (series 1)
 Ceri Murphy as Aled (series 1)
 Gillian Elisa as Liz (series 1)
 Claire Cage as Leanne (series 1)
 Owain Gwynne as Cai (series 1)
 Alexandria Riley as Tracy (series 1)
 Neal McWilliams as Paul (series 1)
 Dyfan Dwyfor as DI Morgan Riley (series 2)
 David Hayman as Jeff Campbell, a local crime boss (series 2)
 Hedydd Dylan as Caryn (series 2)
 Tim Preston as Harri (series 2)
 Chris Gordon as Richie (series 2)
 Alexander Vlahos as Dai (series 2)
 Rachel Issac as Eve (series 2)
 Sophie Melville as Marissa (series 2)
 Berwyn Pearce as Duncan (series 2)
 Lloyd Everitt as Mark (series 2)
 Lisa Nicol as Jan (series 2)

Episodes

Series 1 (2017)

Series 2 (2020)

References

External links

2017 British television series debuts
2020 British television series endings
2010s Welsh television series
S4C original programming
Television series by Endemol
2010s British police procedural television series
2020s British police procedural television series
English-language television shows
Television shows set in Wales